World records in the 50-metre breaststroke competitive swimming event are recorded for men and women in 50-metre pools (long course) and 25-metre pools (short course).

Men

Long course

Short course

Women

Long course

Short course

All-time top 25

Men long course
Correct as of August 2022

Notes
Below is a list of other times equal or superior to 26.86:
Adam Peaty also swam 25.99 (2017), 26.06 (2019), 26.09 (2018), 26.10 (2017), 26.11 (2019), 26.21 (2021), 26.23 (2018), 26.28 (2019), 26.34 (2021), 26.38 (2021), 26.41 (2018), 26.42 (2015), 26.48 (2017), 26.49 (2018, 2019), 26.50 (2017, 2018), 26.51 (2015), 26.53 (2019), 26.55 (2019), 26.60 (2017, 2019), 26.61 (2016, 2017, 2019), 26.62 (2014, 2017, 2018), 26.63 (2019, 2019, 2021), 26.64 (2019, 2021), 26.65 (2021), 26.66 (2016, 2016), 26.68 (2015, 2016), 26.69 (2016, 2021), 26.70 (2019), 26.71 (2016, 2019), 26.72 (2021), 26.73 (2018, 2021), 26.74 (2018, 2018, 2019), 26.75 (2018, 2021), 26.76 (2022), 26.78 (2014, 2019), 26.81 (2021), 26.83 (2017, 2020), 26.86 (2017, 2021).
Ilya Shymanovich also swam 26.46 (2021), 26.47 (2021, 2022), 26.55 (2019, 2021), 26.57 (2019), 26.70 (2020, 2022), 26.72 (2021), 26.77 (2019), 26.78 (2019), 26.83 (2020), 26.84 (2022), 26.85 (2019, 2021), 26.86 (2018, 2021).
Nicolò Martinenghi also swam 26.39 (2021), 26.47 (2021), 26.48 (2022), 26.49 (2021, 2022), 26.54 (2021), 26.56 (2020, 2022), 26.59 (2021), 26.64 (2022), 26.71 (2022), 26.68 (2021, 2021, 2022), 26.81 (2022), 26.85 (2019).
Felipe Lima also swam 26.48 (2019), 26.60 (2019), 26.61 (2019), 26.62 (2019), 26.66 (2019), 26.68 (2017, 2019), 26.72 (2019), 26.73 (2019), 26.75 (2019), 26.78 (2019), 26.79 (2019), 26.84 (2018), 26.85 (2019), 26.86 (2019).
João Gomes Júnior also swam 26.52 (2017), 26.60 (2019), 26.62 (2022), 26.64 (2019, 2019), 26.66 (2022), 26.67 (2017), 26.68 (2019), 26.69 (2019), 26.70 (2019), 26.73 (2019), 26.75 (2022), 26.80 (2017, 2019), 26.83 (2017), 26.84 (2019), 26.85 (2018), 26.86 (2017).
Nic Fink also swam 26.55 (2022), 26.74 (2022), 26.85 (2022).
Cameron van der Burgh also swam 26.58 (2018), 26.60 (2017), 26.62 (2015), 26.66 (2015), 26.67 (2009), 26.74 (2009, 2015, 2015, 2017), 26.76 (2014), 26.77 (2013, 2015), 26.78 (2013), 26.79 (2015), 26.80 (2014), 26.81 (2013), 26.83 (2013).
Michael Andrew also swam 26.71 (2022), 26.72 (2022), 26.73 (2022), 26.78 (2022), 26.83 (2021), 26.84 (2018), 26.86 (2018).
Fabio Scozzoli also swam 26.73 (2018), 26.79 (2018), 26.80 (2018), 26.82 (2019).
Felipe França Silva also swam 26.76 (2009).
Andrey Nikolaev also swam 26.77 (2022), 26.86 (2022).
Christian Sprenger also swam 26.78 (2013).
Kevin Cordes also swam 26.80 (2017), 26.83 (2017), 26.86 (2015, 2017).
Damir Dugonjič also swam 26.83 (2013).
Kirill Prigoda also swam 26.85 (2017).

Men short course
Correct as of December 2022

Notes
Below is a list of other times equal or superior to 25.85:
Emre Sakçı also swam 25.29 (2020), 25.38 (2021), 25.39 (2021), 25.43 (2020), 25.50 (2020), 25.54 (2020), 25.57 (2020).
Ilya Shymanovich also swam 25.39 (2020), 25.41 (2020, 2021), 25.43 (2021), 25.47 (2021), 25.48 (2020), 25.53 (2021), 25.55 (2020, 2021), 25.56 (2021), 25.57 (2020), 25.59 (2020), 25.60 (2021), 25.64 (2020, 2021), 25.68 (2020), 25.72 (2020).
Cameron van der Burgh also swam 25.41 (2018), 25.43 (2009), 25.49 (2017), 25.58 (2009), 25.63 (2009, 2017), 25.64 (2016), 25.68 (2013), 25.70 (2017).
Adam Peaty also swam 25.48 (2020), 25.50 (2020), 25.70 (2017, 2020), 25.85 (2022).
Nic Fink also swam 25.53 (2021), 25.64 (2022), 25.68 (2021), 25.72 (2021).
Nicolò Martinenghi also swam 25.42 (2022), 25.54 (2021), 25.55 (2021), 25.60 (2022), 25.71 (2022).
Roland Schoeman also swam 25.58 (2009), 25.65 (2013), 25.68 (2013).
Kirill Prigoda also swam 25.68 (2017), 25.72 (2017).
Simone Cerasuolo also swam 25.68 (2022), 25.78 (2022), 25.85 (2021).
Felipe França Silva also swam 25.70 (2009), 25.71 (2014).
Fabio Scozzoli also swam 25.72 (2013).
Qin Haiyang also swam 25.82 (2022).

Women long course
Correct as of August 2022

Notes
Below is a list of other times equal or superior to 30.23:
Benedetta Pilato also swam 29.35 (2021), 29.50 (2021), 29.58 (2022), 29.61 (2020), 29.62 (2021), 29.69 (2021), 29.71 (2022), 29.75 (2021), 29.80 (2022), 29.83 (2022), 29.85 (2020, 2022), 29.91 (2021), 29.93 (2022), 29.98 (2019, 2021), 30.00 (2019), 30.08 (2019), 30.13 (2019, 2021), 30.16 (2019), 30.17 (2019), 30.22 (2019).
Yuliya Yefimova also swam 29.57 (2017), 29.66 (2018), 29.73 (2017), 29.78 (2013), 29.81 (2018), 29.84 (2018), 29.88 (2013, 2017), 29.93 (2018, 2019), 29.95 (2017), 29.99 (2017, 2017), 30.04 (2017, 2019), 30.09 (2009), 30.12 (2013, 2019), 30.13 (2015), 30.14 (2015), 30.15 (2012, 2019), 30.17 (2018, 2019), 30.20 (2018), 30.22 (2018, 2021), 30.23 (2017).
Rūta Meilutytė also swam 29.48 (2013), 29.59 (2013, 2022), 29.70 (2022), 29.74 (2015), 29.86 (2013), 29.88 (2014, 2015), 29.89 (2014), 29.92 (2014), 29.96 (2013), 29.97 (2013, 2022), 29.98 (2015, 2016), 30.04 (2013), 30.07 (2013), 30.10 (2013), 30.11 (2013), 30.12 (2022), 30.13 (2016), 30.14 (2014, 2015), 30.17 (2016), 30.18 (2017), 30.19 (2013), 30.20 (2017), 30.23 (2013).
Lilly King also swam 29.60 (2017), 29.62 (2018), 29.63 (2019), 29.66 (2017), 29.76 (2017, 2022), 29.80 (2017), 29.82 (2018), 29.84 (2019, 2019), 29.90 (2017), 29.96 (2017), 30.03 (2019), 30.16 (2018), 30.18 (2019), 30.22 (2016).
Lara van Niekerk also swam 29.73 (2022), 29.77 (2022), 29.80 (2022), 29.82 (2022), 29.88 (2021), 29.90 (2022), 29.99 (2022), 30.08 (2022).
Molly Hannis also swam 29.73 (2018), 29.97 (2018), 30.07 (2018), 30.19 (2017), 30.21 (2018).
Jessica Hardy also swam 29.90 (2013), 29.95 (2009), 29.99 (2013), 30.03 (2010), 30.12 (2014), 30.17 (2011), 30.19 (2011), 30.20 (2011, 2015), 30.21 (2014).
Imogen Clark also swam 30.04 (2018), 30.10 (2022), 30.18 (2022), 30.21 (2017).
Arianna Castiglioni also swam 29.91 (2022), 30.05 (2022), 30.06 (2021), 30.15 (2021).
Chelsea Hodges also swam 30.15 (2022), 30.17 (2022), 30.20 (2021), 30.22 (2022).
Katie Meili also swam 30.11 (2017), 30.12 (2017).
Anna Elendt also swam 30.12 (2022), 30.22 (2022).
Alia Atkinson also swam 30.17 (2014), 30.19 (2018).
Breeja Larson also swam 30.20 (2013).
Tang Qianting also swam 30.21 (2022).
Jennie Johansson also swam 30.23 (2013).

Women short course
Correct as of December 2022

Notes
Below is a list of other times equal or superior to 29.59:
Rūta Meilutytė also swam 28.50 (2022), 28.60 (2022), 28.70 (2022), 28.81 (2014), 28.84 (2014), 28.89 (2013), 29.10 (2022).
Alia Atkinson also swam 28.64 (2016), 28.84 (2017), 28.88 (2020), 28.91 (2014, 2016).
Benedetta Pilato also swam 28.86 (2020), 29.42 (2022), 29.48 (2022).
Lilly King also swam 28.86 (2020, 2022), 28.90 (2019, 2020), 29.11 (2022), 29.16 (2022), 29.53 (2022).
Tang Qianting also swam 29.22 (2022), 29.28 (2022), 29.38 (2022), 29.42 (2022).
Lara van Niekerk also swam 29.27 (2022), 29.45 (2022).
Nika Godun also swam 29.42 (2021).
Imogen Clark also swam 29.47 (2022), 29.51 (2022).
Anna Elendt also swam 29.52 (2022), 29.59 (2022).

Annulled
Yulia Yefimovas World Record performance of 28.71 (Tokyo 2013) was annulled due to doping offenses.

References 

  Zwemkroniek
  Agenda Diana

Breaststroke 050 metres
World record progression 050 metres breaststroke